Nomsa Innocencia Tarabella Marchesi (born 2 July 1970) is a South African politician from the Democratic Alliance. She has been a member of the National Assembly of South Africa since 2014.

She served as a Whip in the Shadow Cabinet of Mmusi Maimane. She is currently a member of the Portfolio Committee on Basic Education in South Africa's parliament.

References

External links 
 Twitter
 Facebook

Living people
1970 births
Members of the National Assembly of South Africa
Women members of the National Assembly of South Africa
Democratic Alliance (South Africa) politicians
21st-century South African politicians
People from Bloemfontein